The Wild Zappers is an all deaf all male dance group that combines American Sign Language, music and dance to promote the education of sign language to both Deaf and hearing communities.

Background 

The Wild Zappers was formed by Irvine Stewart in 1989. The group is composed of Fred Beam (director), Warren Snipe (Assistant Director), Irvine Stewart, Ronnie Bradley, Kris Pumphrey, Sam Franklin, Buck Rogers, and George Azmaveth. The group has performed all over North America and has also toured internationally. They perform to popular music like "Escapade" by Janet Jackson or "Imma Be" by The Black Eyed Peas.  The Wild Zappers also occasionally tour and dance with the National Deaf Dance Theatre. Videos of Wild Zappers performing can be watched on YouTube.

The Wild Zappers have two main workshops focusing on American Sign Language and Deaf culture education.  "Sign Me a Story" was developed for elementary aged children.  "Let's Sign and Dance" is targeted towards families and teaches how Deaf people perform along with American Sign Language.

Organization 
Invisible Hands Inc.

Fred Beam founded Invisible Hands, Inc. to promote Deaf culture awareness.  This non-profit organization recruits groups like the Wild Zappers who want to promote Deaf culture through the arts.  They also provide professional training to educate the Deaf to find employment in the arts field.  The Wild Zappers and National Deaf Dance Theater are sponsored by Invisible Hands, Inc.

Dance Style 
The Wild Zappers perform using hip-hop and funk dance styles.  Although they cannot hear the music they dance to, they utilize eight counts to keep a beat.  They can also feel vibrations from the music and a few members of the group wear hearing aides.

Public Exposure and Outreach 
Awards

Fred Beam and Warren Snipe have won the Linowes and Media Access Award.  Fred Beam was also selected for Essence Magazine "Real Men of the Year" in 2006 for his work in the Deaf community.

Black Deaf Expo

Fred Beam established and hosts the Black Deaf Expo.  He also served on the board of Black Deaf Advocates and was once the President of National Black Deaf Advocates.  He established a theater program to teach artistic leadership to people of color at Gallaudet University

Theatrical Appearances 
If You Could Hear My Own Tune

The Wild Zappers appeared in the movie "If You Could Hear My Own Tune" which premiered in January 2011.  The film is about the difficulties of communication and understanding when hearing and non-hearing communities come together.

References

External links 
 Wild Zappers at The John F. Kennedy Center for the Performing Arts

Deaf culture in the United States
Dance companies in the United States
Deafness arts organizations
Disability organizations based in the United States